Wainhouse Corner is a hamlet in north Cornwall, England, United Kingdom. It is at a crossroads on the A39 main road, between Camelford and Bude. Canworthy Water and Crackington Haven are the destinations of the B road.

References

Hamlets in Cornwall